The 1966 Texas Western Miners football team was an American football team that represented Texas Western College (now known as the University of Texas at El Paso) as an independent during the 1966 NCAA University Division football season. In its second season under head coach Bobby Dobbs, the team compiled a 6–4 record and outscored opponents by a total of 293 to 187.

This was the final season for the program as Texas Western, as the school changed its name to the University of Texas at El Paso a year later.

Schedule

References

Texas Western
UTEP Miners football seasons
Texas Western Miners football